Zygmunt Kazanowski (1563–1634) was a noble (szlachcic), magnate in the Polish–Lithuanian Commonwealth. Courtier and Court Marshal of kings Stefan Batory, Sigismund III Vasa and teacher of Wladyslaw IV Waza. From 1613 Starost of Kokenhaus and Krosno, from 1617 starost of Bacicko, from 1633 starost of Mukarowo, Solecko and Klobucko and Court Chamberlain.

Zygmunt was a soldier, and spend much time fighting for his country. He took part in the Battle of Kircholm, and the defense of Chocim. For his military valor and experience he became teacher to Zygmunt's son, Wladyslaw. During the funerals of king Zygmunt and queen Konstancja he carried the royal insignia.

He was first married to Zofia Warszewicka around 1591 and they had daughter Zofia Kazanowska. In 1615 he married Elżbieta Humnicka, with whom he had several children: Helena Kazanowska, Katarzyna Kazanowska, Aleksandra Kazanowska, Stanisław Kazanowski (?–1648), Adam Kazanowski (1599–1649).

In 1627 he ceded villages of Grzymałów, Kazanów i Ciepielów to his sons. His sons raised together with crown prince Wladyslaw (crowned in 1634) gained much influence over the young prince. Especially Adam used to extend his family wealth, when Wladyslaw often lavishly showered him with expensive gifts.

Zygmunt died in 1634 and was buried in the St.John Chapel in Warsaw.

Zygmunt
1563 births
1634 deaths